Santa Rosa del Monday is a district of the Alto Paraná Department, Paraguay.

Districts of Alto Paraná Department